The Brethren Cemetery is a cemetery at Oktyabrskiy District of the city of Rostov-on-Don, Russia.

History 
The cemetery, which is situated on the outskirts of the city, was inititllay considered to be a place for burial of the poor, here there were mostly brethren graves. So the cemetery's name derived from here. Later, a section for deceased soldiers and officers appeared at the cemetery, which mostly hasn't survived until our days.

The cemetery has monuments dedicated to soldiers of Rostov-on-Don People's Militia Regiment, who died in November 1941 and a monument in honor of soldiers the 230st NKVD Regiment who also died in November 1941 while defending Rostov-on-Don from invading German forces.

From 1998 it is permitted to bury relatives of the ones already buried at the territory of the cemetery.

At the Brethren Cemetery situated the Church of the Ascension of the Lord, which was built in 1913.

Famous people buried at the Brethren Cemetery 
 Borys Dumenko – a commander of the Red Army
 Leonid Eberg – an architect who worked in Rostov-on-Don
 Alexander Borchaninov – a revolutionary and a statesman

References

External links
 

Cemeteries in Rostov-on-Don